Koresh may refer to:
 Cyrus, a given name
 Cyrus the Great (c. 600–530 BCE)
 Cyrus Teed, American spiritualist (1839–1908)  
 David Koresh (pseudonym; 1959–1993), American religious leader of a former Branch Davidian sect
 Köräş, various folk wrestling styles of Central Asia

See also
 Koreshi, a surname

Hebrew-language names